Gladys Maritza Ruiz de Vielman (also known as Gladys Maritzha Ruiz Sanchez de Vielman) (born August 30, 1945) served as the Minister of Foreign Affairs of Guatemala. She worked as a lawyer and law school lecturer and represented Guatemala as the Ambassador to the United States She also served as the Ambassador of Guatemala to the Netherlands.

Education 
Ruiz de Vielman received her law degree from the Universidad Rafael Landivar in 1973 where she specialized in international, commercial and family law. She studied abroad in the United States, Brazil and France. Her first language is Spanish and she also speaks English, Portuguese, and French.

Career

Law 
After graduating from law school, Ruiz de Vielman started her own law firm. Her firm's most frequent clients were the Guatemalan government as well as the Guatemalan private sector. She has worked as a lawyer on behalf of a number of other Latin American countries in hearings before the World Trade Organization over trade disputes.

Diplomacy 
Ruiz de Vielman's diplomatic career began in 1986. She has served as permanent representative of Guatemala to the International Coffee Organization, International Sugar Organization, and the International Maritime Organization. She is accredited by the International Court of Justice, an accreditation she earned after representing Guatemala in a case against Belize concerning territorial rights.

After holding the position of Minister of Foreign Affairs (1994-1995), Ruiz de Vielman served as the Ambassador for Guatemala in the United Kingdom and Northern Ireland from 2000 to 2003. She was then appointed to represent Guatemala as the country’s Ambassador to the United States from 2016 to 2017. Her appointment, which came after the position had been vacant for over six months, broke barriers as she was the first woman to represent Guatemala in the United States. After her time in the United States, she was appointed to be Guatemala’s Ambassador to the Kingdom of the Netherlands.

References 

Wikipedia Student Program
Living people
1945 births
Ambassadors of Guatemala to the United States
Foreign ministers of Guatemala